Silesian as an adjective can mean anything from or related to Silesia.  As a noun, it refers to an article, item, or person of or from Silesia.

Silesian may also refer to:

People and languages
Silesians, inhabitants of Silesia, either a West Slavic (for example Ślężanie), or Germanic people (Schlesier or Silingi)
List of Silesians
Silesian tribes
Silesian language, West Slavic language / dialect
Cieszyn Silesian dialect
Texas Silesian
Silesian German language (Lower Silesian language), a Germanic dialect

Events
Silesian Wars (1740–1763)
Silesian Uprisings (1919–1921)
Silesian Eagle
Silesian Uprising Cross
Silesian Offensive
Silesian Offensives

Political divisions
Province of Silesia, 1815–1919 and 1938 to 1941, a province of Prussia within Germany
Silesian Voivodeship (1920–1939), an autonomous territorial unit of Poland (1920-1939)
Silesian Parliament, parliament of the autonomous Silesian Voivodeship (1920-1939)
Silesian Treasury, treasury of the autonomous Silesian Voivodeship (1920-1939)
Silesian-American Corporation
Silesian Voivodeship, a present-day division of Poland (see also Lower Silesian Voivodeship)
Silesian Regional Assembly
Moravian-Silesian Region, a present-day division of Czech Republic

Organisations
Silesian Autonomy Movement
Silesian Institute in Katowice
Silesian (European Parliament constituency), the corresponding constituency
Silesian People's Party
Silesian Socialist Party
Silesian Military District
Silesian Evangelical Church of Augsburg Confession
Evangelical Church in Berlin, Brandenburg and Silesian Upper Lusatia

Geography
Silesian Beskids
Silesian Beskids Landscape Park
Moravian-Silesian Beskids
Silesian Foothills
Silesian-Moravian Foothills
Silesian Upland
Silesian Lowlands
Silesian Przesieka
Silesian Walls
Silesian-Lusatian Lowlands

Culture
Silesian Park
Silesian Stadium
Silesian Planetarium
Silesian Amusement Park
Silesian Zoological Garden
Silesian Theatre
Silesian Museum
Silesian Philharmonic
Silesian Opera
Silesian String Quartet
Silesian Library
Silesian Fantasy Club
Coat of arms of Silesia, Silesian eagle

Transport
Silesian Interurbans
Silesian Railways
Silesian Air
Silesian Mountain Railway

Other
Silesian (series), a European subdivision of the Carboniferous period of the geological timescale
Silesian Piasts
Silesian architecture
Silesian horse
Silesian Insurgents' Monument
Silesian Metropolis
Moravian–Silesian Football League
Silesian Wikipedia
Silesian cuisine
Silesian dumplings
Silesian University of Technology
Silesian University (Opava)
Silesian Chess Congress
Silesian National Publishing House

See also 
Silesia (disambiguation)
Upper Silesian (disambiguation)
Lower Silesian (disambiguation)
Schlesinger
Angelus Silesius, a baroque mystic from Silesia

Language and nationality disambiguation pages